Sciortino may refer to:

Antonio Sciortino (1879–1947), Maltese sculptor
Carl Sciortino (born 1978), Massachusetts politician
Giuseppe Sciortino, Quebec lawyer and activist
John Sciortino (born 1943), Kansas City mafia figure
Onofrio Sciortino, San Jose mafia figure  

Surnames of Italian origin